is a doujin boxing video game released at the Comic Revolution 31 convention in May 2002 by Watanabe Seisakujo (now French-Bread). The name of the game is a take on "Groove on Fight", which is a sequel of the Power Instinct series, though other than that the two games have very little in common. The game was developed to test routines that the programmer would use in Melty Blood.

Characters
The game features characters from various sources, including anime, dating sims, other doujin, and a company mascot. When the game is played for the first time, only five characters are available. Three more will be unlocked when the player progresses through the game (which are the three last opponents in the game), making a total of eight playable characters.

Initial characters:
Ayu Tsukimiya (from Kanon)
Ciel (from Tsukihime)
Dejiko (from Di Gi Charat)
Ecoco (company mascot of Tohoku Electric Power)
Seika Mori (from Gunparade March)

Unlockable characters:
Satsuki Yumizuka (from Tsukihime)
Akiko Minase (from Kanon)
Ayaka Kurusugawa (from To Heart)

They were called "Glove on Fight" and "Glove on Fight 2".

Sequel
A sequel to Glove on Fight called  was released on August 16, 2008.

References

External links

Insert Credit's review of Glove on Fight
NTSC-uk looks at Glove on Fight and other Doujin games

2002 video games
Doujin video games
Crossover fighting games
Japan-exclusive video games
Video games developed in Japan
Windows games
Windows-only games